Dave MacIsaac (born 1955) is a Canadian musician from Nova Scotia who plays the fiddle and guitar, specialising in the Celtic music style. He has two children, a daughter Mary Clare and a son named Angus.

Awards and recognition
1996: East Coast Music Awards - winner: Male Artist of the Year; Instrumental Artist of the Year; Celtic Recording of the Year (Nimble Fingers)
2017 : Honorary Doctorate from Cape Breton University

Discography
1986 Celtic Guitar
1993: with Scott Macmillan, Guitar Souls
1995: Nimble Fingers
1999: From the Archives
2001: with Ashley MacIsaac, Fiddle Music 101

References

External links
Dirty Linen: 1996 ECMA Awards 
Dave MacIsaac and Scott Macmillan: Guitar Souls

1955 births
Living people
Canadian male violinists and fiddlers
Canadian guitarists
Musicians from Nova Scotia
Cape Breton fiddlers
Canadian male guitarists
21st-century Canadian violinists and fiddlers
21st-century Canadian male musicians